The 2016 Ball State Cardinals football team represented Ball State University in the 2016 NCAA Division I FBS football season. They were led by first-year head coach Mike Neu and played their home games at Scheumann Stadium. They were a member of the West Division of the Mid-American Conference. They finished the season 4–8, 1–7 in MAC play to finish in last place in the West Division.

Schedule

Schedule Source:

Game summaries

at Georgia State

at Indiana

Eastern Kentucky

at Florida Atlantic

Northern Illinois

at Central Michigan

at Buffalo

Akron

Western Michigan

Eastern Michigan

at Toledo

at Miami (OH)

References

Ball State
Ball State Cardinals football seasons
Ball State Cardinals football